The Blandowski expedition was a scientific expedition that travelled from Melbourne to the area of the junction of the Darling and Murray Rivers in north-western Victoria, and south-western New South Wales, Australia, to study the natural history of the region and to acquire specimens for the Victorian Museum.  It was led by William Blandowski, the Victorian government zoologist, and included his assistant, Gerard Krefft.  It took place in 1856-1857.

References

Exploration of Australia
Australian expeditions